Peter Baldwin (born 24 August 1968) is a former Australian rules footballer who played with Geelong in the Victorian Football League (VFL).

Baldwin, originally from Finley, went to Assumption College. A wingman, Baldwin made two appearances late in the 1987 VFL season, then struggled with injuries, before returning to the seniors in 1990 and playing in the opening three rounds.

He went to North Melbourne in the 1991 Pre-Season Draft, but didn't play a league game for the club.

References

External links
 
 

1968 births
Australian rules footballers from New South Wales
Geelong Football Club players
Finley Football Club players
Living people